In mathematics, a metasymplectic space, introduced  by  and , is a Tits building of type F4 (a specific generalized incidence structure).
The four types of vertices are called  points, lines, planes, and symplecta.

References

Incidence geometry